This is a list of years in China.

Yuan dynasty

Ming dynasty

Qing dynasty

Republic of China

People's Republic of China

 
China history-related lists
China